Albert Walker Mondane (born June 29, 1990), known professionally as Sauce Walka, is an American rapper and songwriter from Houston, Texas.

Personal life
He is of Honduran descent.

Career

Albert Mondane started his rapping career in 2007 under the name A-Walk, and was part of a Houston rap group called Mostheard.
Mondane began releasing mixtapes as Sauce Walka in 2014, in the same year forming the duo Sauce Twinz with fellow rapper Sancho Saucy. He credits himself with popularizing the modern usage of the hip-hop slang term "drip", a word he uses extensively throughout his lyrics. In 2015, Mondane gained attention after releasing a diss song titled "Wack 2 Wack" targeted at Drake, accusing him of appropriating Houston hip-hop culture.

Sauce Walka has collaborated with various notable hip-hop acts such as A$AP Rocky, Bun B, Chief Keef, Lil' Keke, Maxo Kream, Migos, Slim Thug, Travis Scott, Trinidad James, and XXXTentacion.

The Sauce Factory
Sauce Walka founded the independent record label The Sauce Factory in 2014. The label name is often abbreviated as TSF. TSF has currently signed 5th Ward JP, Peso Peso, Rizzoo Rizzoo, Rodji Diego, and Sancho Saucy.

Legal issues
Mondane was involved in a gun-related incident in summer of 2009. Court records show that Mondane pleaded guilty to deadly conduct after being charged with shooting and wounding a person during a concert at Texas Southern University, which resulted in him serving community supervision. In 2018, Houston Police told KPRC that Mondane was involved in a criminal street gang called "Mash Mode" in 2009, at the time going by the moniker "A-Walk".

In 2018, Texas state court documents described The Sauce Factory as a "documented gang" and "known for criminal activity". In response to the accusations, Mondane stated:

Discography

Mixtapes

External links
Sauce Walka on Twitter
Sauce Walka on Instagram

References

1990 births
African-American male rappers
American male rappers
Living people
People from Houston
Rappers from Houston
Rappers from Texas
Songwriters from Texas
American people of Honduran descent
Southern hip hop musicians
21st-century American rappers
21st-century American male musicians
African-American songwriters
21st-century African-American musicians
American male songwriters